AMC Middle East and Africa is a European-based pay television channel which was launched by AMC Networks International in Africa and the Arab World. AMC replaced the MGM Channel on 1 December 2014. AMC-produced dramas such as Halt and Catch Fire and The Divide are among the first original series that premiered on the channel. The channel also airs films from MGM, Universal Studios, Paramount Pictures, Disney (20th Century Studios) and Sony Pictures Entertainment.

On 1 August 2016, AMC stopped broadcasting on OSN and moved to beIN in the Arab World.

Programming
4th and Loud
Breaking Bad
Fargo
Fear the Walking Dead
Halt and Catch Fire
Hollywood's Best Film Directors
Mad Men
Rectify
The Divide
The Night Manager

References

AMC Networks International